Vali Asr (also Romanized as Valī ʿAşr) is a village in Feyziyeh Rural District, in the Central District of Babol County, Mazandaran Province, Iran. At the 2006 census, its population was 243, in 64 families.

References 

Populated places in Babol County